Encirclement – Neo-Liberalism Ensnares Democracy (French: L'Encerclement - La démocratie dans les rets du néolibéralisme) is a 2008 Canadian documentary film by Richard Brouillette which was awarded the Robert and Frances Flaherty Prize (Grand Prize) at the 11th Yamagata International Documentary Film Festival (Yamagata, Japan, 2009), the Grand Prize at the 15th Visions du réel festival (Nyon, Switzerland, 2009), the Audience Award for Best feature film, along with a Special Jury Mention for the Amnesty International Award, at the 6th IndieLisboa festival (Lisbon, Portugal, 2009), the Pierre and Yolande Perrault Award for Best first or second documentary at the 27th Rendez-vous du cinéma québécois (Montreal, Canada, 2009), and the La Vague Award for Best documentary film (ex aequo with Hommes à louer, by Rodrigue Jean) at the 23rd Festival international du cinéma francophone en Acadie (Moncton, Canada, 2009).

The world premiere took place at the 11th Rencontres internationales du documentaire de Montréal on November 20, 2008. The international premiere took place at the 59th Berlinale, in the International Forum of New Cinema section, on February 7, 2009.

Synopsis 

Drawing upon the thinking and analyses of renowned intellectuals, the documentary sketches a portrait of neo-liberal ideology and examines the various mechanisms used to impose its dictates throughout the world.

Technical details 

 Producer, Director, Editor: Richard Brouillette
 Scriptwriter and Researcher: Richard Brouillette
 Cinematography: Michel Lamothe
 Sound recording: Simon Goulet
 Additional sound recording: Alexandre Gravel
 Original music: Éric Morin
 Sound mix: Éric Tessier
 Production company: Les films du passeur
 International sales: Andoliado Producciones and Cinema Esperança International
 Distribution in Canada: Amoniak Films Distributions and Cinema Esperança International
 Format : Black and White - HDCAM (shot in 16mm) - Stereo - 16:9 pillarbox (HD) or 4:3 (SD)
 Country: Quebec (Canada)
 Language: original version in French with English subtitles
 Genre: documentary
 Running time: 160 minutes

Starring 
 Noam Chomsky
 Ignacio Ramonet
 Normand Baillargeon
 Susan George
 Omar Aktouf
 Oncle Bernard
 Michel Chossudovsky
 François Denord
 François Brune
 Martin Masse
 Jean-Luc Migué
 Filip Palda
 Donald J. Boudreaux

External links 
 Official site
 

Canadian documentary films
Quebec films
Documentary films about politics
Documentary films about globalization
Black-and-white documentary films
2008 films
2008 documentary films
Films about privatization
Neoliberalism
French-language Canadian films
2000s Canadian films